Christoph H. Müller (born 1967) is a Swiss musician, composer, producer and audio engineer. He is best known as a co-founder of the electronica/neotango band Gotan Project. He is currently a founding and active member of Plaza Francia Orchestra & Müller & Makaroff, both with long time collaborator Eduardo Makaroff.

Biography
As a teenager, Müller was part of different bands, including Touch El Arab, whose song "Muhammar" became a top 5 hit in Switzerland in 1987.

After studies at the Universities of Basel and Zürich he moved to Paris to study at "Ecole des Hautes Etudes en Sciences Sociales". At the same time he continued music and founded together with Paris-based American singer/songwriter Gabriela Arnon the band Ten Mother Tongues. They released one album in 1997, called The Listening Tree.

In 1995 he started a close collaboration with French label Ya Basta records. He released tracks under such names as "The Boyz from Brazil", "Stereo Action Unlimited", and "Fruit of the loop" and worked on music for short films, TV jingles and advertising.

In 1999 he co-founded, together with Argentinean musician Eduardo Makaroff and French producer Philippe Cohen Solal, Gotan Project, whose new form of Argentinean tango has had huge success all over the world. They released three albums: La Revancha del Tango (2001), Lunatico (2006) and Tango 3.0 (2010), and did three successful world tours, until the fall of 2011.

At the same time, Müller founded his own production company, March:Music, in 2004 to develop his other musical projects, like his solo project Roy Dubb and – together with Afro Peruvian musicians – the project RADIOKIJADA, whose first album Nuevos Sonidos Afro Peruanos was released in 2009 on Wrasse records. The album garnered rave reviews in the UK, and the band played at the WOMAD festival in Reading, being one of the highlights, according to The Guardian.

In 2005 he co-composed with Eduardo Makaroff the original music for Not Here to Be Loved, a film by Stéphane Brizé, and in 2007/2008 the soundtrack for El Gaucho, a documentary fiction film by Argentinean director Andres Jarach. The composer/producer duo Müller & Makaroff was thus born. During 2012 & 2013 Müller & Makaroff wrote music for the short film Reencuentro by Argentinean director Pablo Giorgelli (Camera d’or in Cannes for his film Las Acacias) and for Evita, a radio lecture written by Pablo Agüero starring French actress Jeanne Moreau.

Also in 2012 he started a collaboration with electronic music icon Hans-Joachim Roedelius (from Krautrock band Cluster). They played live together in Paris and in Lunz (Austria).

In 2014, Müller & Eduardo Makaroff together collaborated with vocalist Catherine Ringer to form a new band called Plaza Francia. This resulted in their 7 April 2014 release A New Tango Song Book and a subsequent French/European tour which ended in November 2015. 

In 2015, the first album of his collaboration with Roedelius, Imagori, was released by Groenland Records.

In 2018 Plaza Francia changed its name to Plaza Francia Orchestra and released a self titled album featuring Catherine Ringer, Lura and Maria Muliterno on vocals. They also collaborated on this record with Argentinean musicians Pablo Gignoli and Sebastian Volco. The album cover was designed by Argentinian artist Antonio Segui who was based in Paris. They started a new tour during Summer 2018 which ended in Abu Dhabi in Autumn 2019.

Also in 2018, Müller released the second album of his collaboration with Roedelius, Imagori II.

Müller & Eduardo Makaroff have also re-started touring, recording & performing under the moniker Müller & Makaroff'''. In December 2019, they collaborate with visual artist Ian Kornfeld for a new project ANTROPOCENO! which was released for the first time at COP25 in Madrid. 

The first single Antropoceno (atentas al) featuring Fémina, Hilda Lizarazu and Mia Folino was released in the Autmumn of 2020 which was performed at the 2020 UN Global Climate Action Awards. This single was followed by Ahora featuring the voices of Greta Thunberg and David Attenborough. In May 2022 they released Todo puede suceder featuring Kevin Johansen in a joint operation with Brian Eno's EarthPercent organisation. 

 Discography 
 Albums and EPs 
 1987: Touch el Arab - We Believe 1988: Touch el Arab - LRK 1989: Touch el Arab - Limited 1997: Ten Mother Tongues - The Listening Tree 1997: Fruit of the Loop - S*xplore (maxi 12")
 1997: The Boyz from Brazil - Solidao (maxi 12")
 1997: The Boyz from Brazil - Chica Boom (maxi 12")
 1998: Stereo Action Unlimited - Hifi Trumpet 1999: The Boyz from Brazil
 1999: Gotan Project - Vuelvo al sur/El capitalismo foraneo (maxi 10")
 2000: Gotan Project - Santa Maria (maxi 10")
 2000: Gotan Project - Triptico (maxi 10")
 2000: Stereo Action Unlimited - Lovelight (maxi 12")
 2001: Gotan Project - La revancha del tango 2005: Radiokijada - Nuevos sonidos afroperuanos part I (maxi 12")
 2006: Gotan Project - Lunatico 2006: Je ne suis pas là pour être aimé (soundtrack)
 2006: Roy Dubb - Harambe (maxi 12")
 2006: Roy Dubb - Afro Blue (maxi 12")
 2007: Les Meilleurs Meilleurs - livre CD pour enfants 2008: Soundtrack of the film El gaucho 2009: Radiokijada - Nuevos sonidos afroperuanos 2010: Gotan Project - Tango 3.0 2014: Plaza Francia - A new tango songbook 2015: Plaza Francia - Live Re-Experience 2015: Mueller_Roedelius - Imagori 2018: Plaza Francia Orchestra - Plaza Francia Orchestra 2018: Mueller_Roedelius - Imagori II Compilations 

 1989: TransEuropa: A Swiss-Swedish Techno Sampler  1989: Stop the Army Vol.I 1997: Soundtrack of the film Clubbed to death 1998: Soundtrack of the film Je ne voudrais pas crever un dimanche 2004: Inspiracion/Espiracion: A Gotan Project DJ set 2007: Ya Basta Records: 10 years after allGotan Project's music has been released on many compilation albums and has been used in many feature films and TV series.

 Filmography 

 Original music 
 Je n'aimerais pas crever un dimanche (1998)
 Not Here to Be Loved (2005)
 El gaucho (de Andrés Jarach) (2009)
 Au fil d'Ariane (2014)

 With Gotan Project 
 Tom at the Farm (Tom à la ferme) "Santa Maria (del buen ayre)"
 Shall We Dance - "Santa María (del buen ayre)” 2001
 Ocean's 12 - "El Capitalismo Foraneo"
 The Bourne Identity - "Época"
 The Truth about Charlie - "Época"
 Meant to Be - "Época"
 Knight & Day - "Santa María (del buen ayre)” "Santa María Pepe Braddock rmx" "Diferente"
 Lies & Alibis - "Santa María (del buen ayre)“
 Guess Who - "Queremos Paz"
 Benjamim - "Vuelvo al Sur"
 Powder Blue - "Amor Porteño"

 Documentaries 
 El Gaucho (directed by Andres Jarach)

 With Gotan Project 
 Maradona, Gamin en Or The Take (directed by Naomi Klein)

 TV series 

 With Gotan Project Nip/Tuck S05E13 - "El Capitalismo Foráneo"
 S03E15 - "Santa María (del buen ayre)”Chuck S01E03 - "Santa María (del buen ayre)“Sex and the City S06E20 - "Queremos Paz" Six Feet Under S03E09 - "Vuelvo al Sur"Brothers & Sisters S04E05 - "Santa María (del buen ayre)Dancing With the Stars (2009)
 Round Eight - "Santa María (del buen ayre)
 Round Six -"Mi Confesión"
 Round Three - "Cité Tango"So You Think You Can Dance''
 USA
 Top 12 Perform (2011) - "Tríptico"
 Top 18 Perform (2008) - "Mi Confesión"
 Canada
 Top 20 (2008) - "Santa María (del buen ayre)”
 Australia
 Top 16 Perform (2008) - "Santa María (del buen ayre)“

Awards 

 BBC Radio 3 Awards for World Music UK - 2003
 BBC Radio 3 Awards for World Music UK - 2007
Victoires de la Musique France - 2003 
Grand Prix SACEM France - 2010

Distinctions 

 Chevalier des Arts et des Lettres

References

External links
 Gotanproject.com
 Plazafrancia.tv
 Radiokijada.com
 Mullerandmakaroff.com
  March:Music Bandcamp
  ANTROPOCENO! Music & Science

1967 births
Living people
Musicians from Stuttgart
Swiss composers
Swiss male composers
Grönland Records artists
Wrasse Records artists
Universal Music Group artists